Bernard Lambourde (born 11 May 1971) is a French former professional footballer who played as a defender.

Career
Lambourde was born in Pointe-à-Pitre, Guadeloupe.

He joined Chelsea in 1997, and in his first season at the club he made seven league appearances. That season Chelsea also won the 1997–98 League Cup and the 1997–98 UEFA Cup Winners' Cup. Lambourde was not part of the squad for either final but contributed three appearances to each of the cup runs. During his spell in England at Chelsea, he is most remembered for scoring the winner in a 1–0 away victory over rivals Tottenham Hotspur in February 2000. He also scored twice more for Chelsea, against Middlesbrough in the league and Vålerenga in the Cup Winners' Cup. He was on the bench when Chelsea won both the 1998 UEFA Super Cup and the 2000 FA Charity Shield.

At the start of the 2000–01 season, Lambourde found himself out of favour at Chelsea. After failing to make an appearance that campaign, he joined Portsmouth on loan in September, playing 6 games. Upon his return to Chelsea he featured in just one game as a late substitute against Manchester United, this proving to be his last appearance for the club.

References

External links

1971 births
Living people
Association football defenders
French footballers
Guadeloupean footballers
AS Cannes players
Angers SCO players
FC Girondins de Bordeaux players
Chelsea F.C. players
SC Bastia players
AS Nancy Lorraine players
French expatriate footballers
Expatriate footballers in England
Expatriate footballers in Saudi Arabia
Premier League players
English Football League players
Ligue 1 players
French expatriate sportspeople in England
French expatriate sportspeople in Saudi Arabia